"Tea and Toast"  is the debut single by English musician Lucy Spraggan. The song was released in the United Kingdom as a digital download on 13 July 2012, and the following year on 13 December 2013, Columbia Records re-released the song. It is included on her studio album Join the Club (2013).

Live performances
She sang the song on The X Factor at bootcamp after Tulisa said that she wanted to hear one of her tracks.  Spraggan said that the song was about a real couple that she had seen. After she performed the song, she burst into tears when she received a standing ovation from the audience and the judging panel.

Inspiration for song
Spraggan explains the inspiration behind "Tea and Toast". She revealed that she was inspired by an elderly couple walking down the street when "the lady collapsed in the street and was unconscious. And the look on the husbands face was like he'd never lost her before and he'd just lost her then. It was horrible and it inspired me to write a song  after I got them into an ambulance."

Track listing

Big Hits 2012 cover version
After Spraggan was asked to remove her album Top Room at the Zoo (2011) from iTunes, a group called Big Hits 2012 took advantage and released their own version. This version charted at No. 52 on the UK Singles Chart, while their version of "Last Night" also charted, at No. 74.

Chart performance
The song entered the UK Singles Chart at number 135 and number 11 on the UK Indie Chart after she performed her song "Last Night" at X Factor auditions which was shown on 25 August 2012. In October 2013, the song re-entered the UK Singles Chart at number 50, due to the release of her album Join the Club.

Weekly charts

Release history

References

2011 songs
2012 debut singles
Lucy Spraggan songs
Columbia Records singles